Michaël Llodra was the defending champion, but lost in the final this year.

Mario Ančić won the title, beating Llodra 7–5, 6–4 in the final.

Seeds

Draw

Finals

Top half

Bottom half

References

 Main draw
 Qualifying draw

Rosmalen Grass Court Championships
2005 ATP Tour